The Historiography of the Paraguayan War has undergone profound changes since the outbreak of the conflict. During and after the war, the historiography of the countries involved, for many, was limited to explaining its causes as due only to the expansionist and excessive ambition of Paraguayan president Francisco Solano López.

However, since the beginning of the war there was a strong movement pointing out the conflict as the responsibility of the Empire of Brazil and of Argentina led by president Bartolomé Mitre. In this reading, Argentine and Uruguayan federalist intellectuals, such as Juan Bautista Alberdi, are brazen. In Uruguay, the criticism of Luis Alberto de Herrera stood out.

In Paraguay, the response to liberal historiography, which resumed the alliance's theses about the Paraguayan War, was also precocious and very strong. This literature was inserted in a broader revisionist context about the country's history, with emphasis on the appreciation of the action of José Gaspar Rodríguez de Francia as the founder of independent Paraguay. Among the main revisionist historians are Cecilio Báez (1862–1941); Manuel Domínguez (1868–1935); Blas Garay (1873–1899) and, finally, Juan E. Leary (1879–1969), considered as the initiator of the "positive lopizta" historiography, that is, that positively explained the war from the action of Francisco Solano López. This literature was and continues to be largely ignored in Brazil. It never embraced the thesis that Britain was responsible for the conflict.

In the 1950s, in Argentina, important literature appeared with a Marxist, populist and revisionist influence on the Paraguayan War, with emphasis on authors such as José María Rosa; Enrique Rivera and Milcíades Peña; Adolfo Saldías, Raúl Scalabrini Ortiz, also little studied and rarely mentioned in Brazil.

In the 1960s, a second historiographic current, more committed to the contemporary ideological struggle of this decade between capitalism and communism, and right and left, presented an interpretation that the conflict was motivated by the interests of the British Empire, which sought to prevent the rise of a militarily and economically powerful Latin American nation. From the 1980s, new studies proposed different reasons, revealing that the causes were due to the nation building processes of the countries involved.

Many of these authors radically denied the thesis of Britain's guilt in the conflict, blaming the Empire of Brazil and Argentina, as in the case of Milcíades Peña and Enrique Rivera, in their classic work. Milcíades Peña was explicit: "Neither the Brazilian monarchy nor the Mitrist oligarchy waged the war in Paraguay on behalf of England". Paradoxically, this historiography also remains unknown in Brazil. Currently, there is an effort to read the conflict that overcomes the mythologies of positive and negative lopizmo.

Traditional historiography (1864–1870) 

The traditional historiography, also called "official", emerged immediately after the conflict and lasted until the end of the 1960s. It was a simplistic and exaggerated view of the causes of the Paraguayan War, claiming that it took place thanks to the infinite ambitions of a supposedly megalomaniac and bloodthirsty Solano López who had the intention to create the "Greater Paraguay" through the conquest of territories of the neighboring countries. The Allies' reaction would then have occurred in a desperate attempt to make the "civilization" of constitutional and democratic countries prevail against the "tyrannical barbarism" of Paraguay ruled by López.

The war's long duration was justified by emperor Pedro II's obstinacy in seeing López defeated for despising him by considering him another Latin American caudillo and consequently, it would be necessary to wash the honor of Brazil. It has also been claimed that the emperor's irritation occurred after a proposal by López to marry princess Isabel, but this never occurred and is a later invention by an American author. Later, the official cult of war heroes such as the Duke of Caxias, the Marquis of Tamandaré, the Marquis of Erval and Mitre emerged. While in Paraguay, from the end of the war to the mid-1930s, López was also seen as a megalomaniac leader who destroyed the country in an unnecessary and futile war.

This was the opinion, for example, of Gustavo Barroso:

Revisionist historiography (1968–1990) 
The so-called revisionist historiography emerged in the late 1960s and gained strength during the 1970s-80s, mainly pushed by Argentine historians. Its remote origins date back to the end of Brazil's imperial period, when dissatisfied republicans and soldiers influenced by Positivism (such as Benjamin Constant) carried out attacks and criticisms regarding Brazil's participation in the conflict. Behind these accusations there was an ideology in common among Brazilian republicans, as well as Argentines and Uruguayans, who aimed to discredit the imperial regime by considering it the only culprit for triggering the Paraguayan War and the supposed atrocities committed. While from the 1920s onwards, a new vision of the war emerged in Paraguay thanks to the efforts of dictators who sought legitimacy for their authoritarian governments by presenting an earlier model represented by Francia, Carlos López and his son Solano López.

The historical revisionism of the Paraguayan War received a boost in 1968 with the publication of the work La Guerra del Paraguay – Gran Negocio! (The Paraguayan War – Big business!) by Argentine writer León Pomer where he claimed that the war took place thanks to Britain's sole interest (Pomer later acknowledged that it was not Britain that "triggered" the war). In the work, like in many others published in the period, Paraguay is presented as a socialist and egalitarian country, in addition to being extremely modern, rich and powerful. Its ruler, Solano López, is presented as a visionary, anti-imperialist and socialist leader who sought to make his country free from foreign imperialist influences. Great Britain, supposedly afraid of this autonomous model and fearing that it could serve as an example for neighboring countries, tried to order Brazil, Argentina and Uruguay, mere "puppets", to destroy Paraguay, consequently exterminating practically the entire Paraguayan population.

Defending the revisionist version, historian Júlio José Chiavenato argued:

In a similar vein, historian Eric Hobsbawm argued that:

Such a view, now considered simplistic and without empirical basis, became widespread from the 1960s onwards by different schools of historians, of the most diverse nationalities and strands.

Among those linked to the Marxist left, there was an interest in transforming Solano López's Paraguay into a kind of precursor of the communist regime in Cuba. According to the revisionism adopted by these historians, Solano López intended to implement an autonomous nationalist regime in Paraguay, opposed to the great empire of his time, in this case Great Britain, in a similar way to the opposition made by Cuba to the USA after the rise of Fidel Castro. There was also the intention, on the part of these historians, to harm the image of the war heroes worshiped by the dictatorial military regimes of the time that persecuted them.

However, Marxists were not the only ones to embrace such an interpretation. The reinforcement of Solano López's supposed heroism also served those linked to the nationalist right. Among the latter, Paraguayan dictator Alfredo Stroessner himself stands out, who even sponsored the filming of the epic movie Cerro Corá, with the aim of reinforcing the image of Francisco Solano López as a Paraguayan martyr.

This revisionist view, which is still taught in most schools in Latin American countries, lacks any kind of hard evidence, data or empirical evidence.

However, the effects of the revisionist historiographical view of the conflict were seen in several generations of Latin Americans (mainly Argentines, Brazilians and Uruguayans) who came to observe their past in a pessimistic way and to despise the historical figures of their countries. Such effects were felt mainly in Paraguay, where, as previously mentioned, the revisionist version was assumed as an official State doctrine, even more so after Solano López's transformation into a flawless hero. Brazilian historian Francisco Doratioto argued that:

Modern historiography (1990–) 

Already in 1930 the British historian Pelham Horton Box in his The Origins of the Paraguayan War had rejected the "mad dictator" theory of the war's origins.  The first book, certainly in the English language, to seek to ascertain the war's causes by a thorough investigation of the available documents, Box wrote that "What emerges most clearly is the fact that the war germinated in the political and economic instability of the states of the Río de la Plata at this period in the history of South America.  The uncertain and shifting factors were Argentina, Uruguay and, to a less extent, Brazil".  The complex set of circumstances he described went back deep into the colonial era.  Although Box was an admirer of Leon Trotsky his book is not written from a Marxist perspective.

In 1990, Brazilian historian Ricardo Salles published the work Guerra do Paraguai: Escravidão e Cidadania na Formação do Exército (Paraguayan War: Slavery and Citizenship in the Formation of the Army), where he presented an analysis of traditional and revisionist historiography: "If traditional studies on the war suffer from an excess of officialism and factualism, in turn, revisionist versions of the history of the conflict tend to simplifications not always based on deeper investigations". This work was one of the first of a new generation of historians who sought to analyze the Paraguayan War.

The studies carried out by these professionals revealed that the causes of the conflict were not due to external influence or the pure and simple ambition of a single man. But the result of a series of factors related to the formation as nation-states of the countries involved and the geopolitical and economic processes of the region, resulting from the historical, political and geographical inheritance of two different cultures: Portuguese and Spanish. Historian Francisco Doratioto concisely presented this new view of the causes of the conflict:

The most detailed analysis, at least in the English language, is Thomas L. Whigham's The Paraguayan War: Causes and Early Conduct (2nd ed., 2018), available as open access.  Professor Whigham was not only interested in why the war started, but why it continued so long.  This he described in his sequel book The Road to Armageddon: Paraguay versus the Triple Alliance, 1866-70, also open access.

References

Citations

Bibliography

Traditional historiography

Revisionist historiography

Modern historiography 

 
 
 
 
 
 
 
 
 

Historiography of South America
Paraguayan War
Paraguayan War